Sujata Mohapatra (born 27  June 1968) is an Indian classical dancer and teacher of Odissi dancing style.

Early life and background
Sujata Mohapatra was born in Balasore in 1968. She started learning Odissi at an early age from Guru Sudhakar Sahu.

Sujata Mohapatra came to Bhubaneshwar, Odisha, in 1987 to further her training under Padma Vibhushan Guru Kelucharan Mohapatra at Odissi Research Center in Bhubaneshwar. She married Ratikant Mohapatra, son of Guru Kelucharan Mohapatra. Her daughter Preetisha Mohapatra is also an Odissi dancer.

Career

Sujata Mohapatra started dancing Odissi classical and folk dance with Sahu's dance troupe in programs across Odisha. Under the tutelage of Kelucharan Mohapatra, her dance style evolved, and she was groomed to become one of the foremost Odissi dancers of her generation. Sujata Mohapatra performs in India, and other countries, as a soloist and a leading member of the Srjan Dance Troupe, founded by her father-in-law.

Sujata Mohapatra is actively involved in teaching Odissi. She is the Principal of 'Srjan' (Odissi Nrityabasa), a prime Odissi Dance Institution founded by MGuru Kelucharan Mohapatra She holds a master's degree in Oriya Literature from Utkal University, and has done research work at the Odissi Research Centre, Bhubaneshwar.

In July 2011, she opened an Odissi Institute - Guru Keerti Srjan, in her hometown, Balasore.

Awards

 Central Sangeet Natak Akademi Award, 2017
 Nritya Choodamani from Krishna Gana Sabha, Chennai, 2014 
 Mahari Award, Pankaj Charan Odissi Research Foundation
 2nd Sanjukta Panigrahi Award, Chitra Krishnamurthi from Washington D.C.
 Aditya Birla Kala Kiran Award, Mumbai
 Raaza Foundation Award, Delhi
 Hope of India, 2001
 Nritya Ragini, Puri, 2002
 Baisakhi Award
 Prana Natta Samman
 Abhi Nandika, Puri, 2004
 Bhimeswar Pratikha Samman, 2004
 Raaza Puruskar, 2008
 Top Grade Artist of Doordarshan Outstanding Category Artist in ICCR

See also
 Indian women in dance

References

External links

1968 births
Living people
People from Balasore
Odissi exponents
Indian female classical dancers
Performers of Indian classical dance
Indian classical choreographers
Indian women choreographers
Indian choreographers
Dancers from Odisha
20th-century Indian dancers
20th-century Indian women artists
Women artists from Odisha
Recipients of the Sangeet Natak Akademi Award